Robert Peter Anderson (1900 – c. 1979) was a rugby union player who represented Australia.

Anderson, a centre, was born in Temora, New South Wales and claimed 1 international rugby cap for Australia.

References

Australian rugby union players
Australia international rugby union players
1900 births
Year of death missing
Rugby union players from New South Wales
Rugby union centres